Dallas Jade Escobedo (born April 12, 1992) is a Mexican-American, former collegiate All-American, Olympian, professional softball pitcher and coach. She played college softball for Arizona State in the from 2011 to 2014, where she led them to the 2011 Women's College World Series title and ranks in several pitching categories for both institutions. She is currently the pitching coach at Cal State Fullerton. 

Escobedo was selected first overall by the Pennsylvania Rebellion in the 2014 NPF Draft. She played for the Rebellion from 2014 to 2016 and the Texas Charge in 2017, currently ranking in career strikeout ratio for the league. She played softball for both Team USA and Team Mexico. She helped Team Mexico place fourth at the 2020 Summer Olympics.

Early life and education
Escobedo is the daughter of Richard Escobedo and Jodi Goch, and has three siblings. She attended St. Mary's High School in Phoenix, Arizona from 2006 to 2010, and won letters in softball and basketball. She pitched for the school's softball team, the Knights, was captain of the team for two seasons, and in 2010 led her team to the State Championship as well as the championship of the MaxPreps Tournament. That year she was named Softball Player of the Year by the Varsity Extra Tribune. She then attended Arizona State University majoring in special education and continuing to play softball from 2011 to 2014.

College career
In 2011, Dallas played for the USA Softball Women's Junior Team, which won the gold medal at the Pan American Championships.

At Arizona State University she was the starting pitcher for the Sun Devils in her freshman year and helped lead the Sun Devils to the 2011 NCAA Division I national softball title. She also played with the Sun Devils as the team  went to the Women's College World Series her sophomore and junior year. She was chosen for the WCWS All-Tournament Team and was voted WCWS co-Most Outstanding Player.

She finished her Sun Devil career with a 115-26 win–loss record and a total of 1,222 strikeouts.

Professional career
Dallas Escobedo was the National Pro Fastpitch No. 1 draft pick in 2014. She joined the Pennsylvania Rebellion and helped give the team their first victory in June 2014. That season she pitched 69 innings in 16 games.

Escobedo pitched for Mexico in the 2016 Women's Softball World Championship.

On December 20, 2017, Escobedo signed a five-year contract with the Scrap Yard Dawgs. About a month later, the Dawgs left NPF and renamed as Scrap Yard Fast Pitch.

Team Mexico
At the Tokyo games, Escobedo went 2–2 for Team Mexico, tossing 20.0 innings and giving up 15 hits, 8 walks and 7 earned runs to finish with a 2.45 ERA and 1.15 WHIP, with 13 strikeouts. Escobedo was the historic first pitcher in the first game for Mexico in the Olympics when the softball tournament opened on July 20 and also earned their first win on July 25, 2021. Mexico lost the Bronze medal game on July 27 to place fourth, Escobedo did not play.

Coaching career
From 2015 to 2017, Escobedo was a graduate assistant at Arizona State. On August 16, 2017, Escobedo became pitching coach at Cal State Fullerton. In her first season on staff, Cal State Fullerton won the 2018 Big West Conference championship with an automatic bid to the NCAA Tournament and qualified for the regional final after an upset win over regional host UCLA.

Career Statistics

References

External links
 

1992 births
Living people
American sportspeople of Mexican descent
Arizona State Sun Devils softball coaches
Arizona State Sun Devils softball players
Cal State Fullerton Titans softball coaches
Female sports coaches
Medalists at the 2011 Pan American Games
Pan American Games gold medalists for the United States
Pan American Games medalists in softball
Pennsylvania Rebellion players
Scrap Yard Dawgs players
Softball coaches from Arizona
Softball players at the 2011 Pan American Games
Softball players from Arizona
Sportspeople from Glendale, Arizona
Women's College World Series Most Outstanding Player Award winners
Mexican softball players
Olympic softball players of Mexico
Softball players at the 2020 Summer Olympics